The Krammer is a body of fresh water located in the western part of Volkerak in the Netherlands.

It is part of the Rhine–Meuse–Scheldt delta, and is situated between the islands Goeree-Overflakkee and Sint Philipsland. To the west, it continues into the Grevelingen, from which it is separated by the Grevelingendam.

Before 1967, it was a tidal river, but it was closed off as part of the Delta Works.

Goeree-Overflakkee
Tholen
Delta Works
Landforms of South Holland
Landforms of Zeeland